Jonathan Kai Kamaka III (born January 5, 1995) is an American mixed martial artist who competes in the Featherweight division of Bellator MMA. He also competed for the Ultimate Fighting Championship (UFC).

Background 
Kai started training martial arts at the age of six under his father Kai Kamaka Jr., who owns the 808 Fight Factory in Hawaii. Kai has a brother named Tristin Kamaka who is a former University of Hawaii Football receiver. Kai attended Pearl City High School where he wrestled and eventually won the HHSAA State Championship after claiming gold in OIA conference finals. For his wrestling accolades, he received a wrestling scholarship to study at Midland University from where he graduated with a bachelor's degree.

Mixed martial arts career

Early career 
In his MMA debut at KOTC Mana, he faced Anthony Reyes and went on to defeat him via unanimous decision. Kamaka submitted Nui Wheeler at Destiny Na Koa 6 via rear-naked choke in the first round. After losing his next two bouts against Andrew Natividad and Jeff Mesa, at KOTC Energetic Pursuit, he defeated Rick James via unanimous decision. Kamaka iii defeated Mauricio Diaz via unanimous decision at KOTC Highlight Reel.

Bellator MMA / LFA 
He won the bout via unanimous decision.

He won the bout via unanimous decision.

After winning a unanimous decision against Michael Stack at LFA 87 on July 31, 2020, he got the call to make his UFC debut on extremely short notice.

Ultimate Fighting Championship 
He won the bout via unanimous decision. This bout earned him a Fight of the Night bonus award 

He lost the bout via TKO in the second round.

He lost the bout via a controversial split decision. 15 out of 15 media members scored the bout for Kamaka.

Kamaka faced Danny Chavez, replacing injured Choi Doo-ho, on July 31, 2021 at UFC on ESPN 28. Kamaka was deducted a point in round two for an illegal groin strike, as a result the fight was ruled a majority draw. 11 out of 13 media outlets scored the bout as a win for Kamaka. The bout was the last of his contract and Kamaka decided to test free agency, parting with the UFC.

Return to Bellator MMA 
On September 28, 2021, Kamaka signed a contract with Bellator to return to the promotion for the second time.

Kamaka, replacing Keoni Diggs, faced John de Jesus on December 3, 2021 at Bellator 272. He won the bout via unanimous decision.

Kamaka faced Justin Gonzales on April 23, 2022 at Bellator 279. He lost the close bout via split decision.

Kamaka was scheduled to face Akhmed Magomedov on July 22, 2022 at Bellator 283. Kamaka however pulled out of the bout due to unknown reasons.

Kamaka faced Kevin Boehm on December 9, 2022 at Bellator 289. He won the fight via TKO in the third round.

Kamaka is scheduled to face Adli Edwards on April 22, 2023 at Bellator 295.

Personal life 
Kai has four children with his wife and currently resides in Las Vegas.

His cousin is Ray Cooper III who is PFL welterweight champion and also his cornerman. His uncle Ronal Jhun is a former UFC veteran.

Kamaka has known UFC matchmaker Sean Shelby, since his childhood when Sean was a camera man for MMA promotions in Hawaii.

Championships and accomplishments 

 Ultimate Fighting Championship
 Fight of the Night (One time)

Mixed martial arts record 

|-
|Win
|align=center|10–5–1
|Kevin Boehm
|TKO (punches)
|Bellator 289
|
|align=center|3
|align=center|2:23
|Uncasville, Connecticut, United States
|
|-
|Loss
|align=center|9–5–1
| Justin Gonzales
| Decision (split)
| Bellator 279
| 
| align=center|3
| align=center|5:00
| Honolulu, Hawaii, United States
|
|-
|Win
|align=center|9–4–1
|John de Jesus
|Decision (unanimous)
|Bellator 272
|
|align=center|3
|align=center|5:00
|Uncasville, Connecticut, United States
|
|-
|Draw
|align=center|8–4–1
|Danny Chavez
|Draw (majority)
|UFC on ESPN: Hall vs. Strickland
|
|align=center|3
|align=center|5:00
|Las Vegas, Nevada, United States
|
|-
|Loss
|align=center|8–4
|T.J. Brown
|Decision (split)
|UFC on ESPN: Reyes vs. Procházka
|
|align=center|3
|align=center|5:00
|Las Vegas, Nevada, United States
|
|-
| Loss
| align=center| 8–3
| Jonathan Pearce
|TKO (punches)
|UFC on ESPN: Smith vs. Clark
|
|align=center| 2
|align=center| 4:28
|Las Vegas, Nevada, United States
|
|-
| Win
| align=center|8–2
|Tony Kelley
|Decision (unanimous)
|UFC 252
|
| align=center| 3
| align=center| 5:00
|Las Vegas, Nevada, United States
|
|-
| Win
| align=center| 7–2
| Michael Stack
| Decision (unanimous)
| LFA 87
| 
| align=center| 3
| align=center| 5:00
| Sioux Falls, South Dakota, United States
|
|-
| Win
| align=center| 6–2
| Spencer Higa
|Decision (unanimous)
|Bellator 236
|
|align=center|3
|align=center|5:00
|Honolulu, Hawaii, United States
|
|-
| Win
| align=center|5–2
|Shojin Miki
|Decision (unanimous)
|Bellator 213
| 
| align=center| 3
| align=center| 5:00
| Honolulu, Hawaii, United States
|
|-
| Win
| align=center|4–2
|Mauricio Diaz
|Decision (unanimous)
|KOTC: Highlight Reel
|
| align=center| 3
| align=center| 5:00
|Ontario, California, United States
|
|-
| Win
| align=center| 3–2
| Rick James
|Decision (unanimous)
|KOTC: Energetic Pursuit
|
| align=center| 3
| align=center| 5:00
|Ontario, California, United States
|
|-
| Loss
| align=center|2–2
|Jeff Mesa
| Decision (unanimous)
| PXC 56
| 
| align=center| 3
| align=center| 5:00
| Mangilao, Guam
|
|-
| Loss
| align=center|2–1
| Andrew Natividad
|TKO (doctor stoppage)
| KOTC: Sanctioned
|
| align=center|1
| align=center|4:40
|San Jacinto, California, United States
|
|-
| Win
| align=center| 2–0
| Nui Wheeler
| Submission (rear-naked choke)
|Destiny Na Koa 6
|
| align=center|1
| align=center|3:20
|Honolulu, Hawaii, United States
|
|-
| Win
| align=center|1–0
| Anthony Reyes
| Decision (unanimous)
|KOTC: Mana
|
|align=center|2
|align=center|5:00
|Honolulu, Hawaii, United States
|

See also 
 List of current Bellator MMA fighters
List of male mixed martial artists

References

External links 
 
 

1995 births
Living people
American male mixed martial artists
Featherweight mixed martial artists
Mixed martial artists utilizing wrestling
American male sport wrestlers
Amateur wrestlers
People from Honolulu County, Hawaii